Roger Hendrix may refer to:

 Roger Hendrix (biologist) (1943–2017), American biologist
 Roger A. Hendrix Sr., business management consultant and author